Love You Live is a double live album by the Rolling Stones, released in 1977. It is drawn from Tour of the Americas shows in the US in the summer of 1975, Tour of Europe shows in 1976 and performances from the El Mocambo nightclub concert venue in Toronto in 1977. It is the band's third official full-length live release and is dedicated to the memory of audio engineer Keith Harwood, who died in a car accident shortly before the album's release. It's also the band's first live album with Ronnie Wood.

History
Love You Live was overdubbed and mixed from late May to mid-June 1977. Released in September 1977, the album was well received and managed to reach No. 3 in the UK and No. 5 in the US, where it went gold.

The album artwork was prepared by Andy Warhol. The hand-drawn titles across the front were added by Mick Jagger, to Warhol's dismay.

Love You Live was The Rolling Stones' final album whereby Rolling Stones Records would be internationally distributed by Warner Music. The band's next several albums would be distributed through EMI worldwide, while they remained with Warner in North America only.

In addition to the songs recorded during the 1975-1976 tour, the Stones decided to add four tracks taken from performances at Toronto's El Mocambo Club on 4 and 5 March 1977. The intention had been to play a set of the sort of classic blues and R&B covers that sealed the band's reputation when they performed regularly at the Crawdaddy Club in 1963. However, Keith Richards arrived late for scheduled rehearsals as he and his girlfriend, Anita Pallenberg, had been arrested for possession and trafficking of illicit drugs in Richards' Toronto hotel room.

Despite these legal troubles, the shows themselves went well enough, though the versions that appear on album are heavily overdubbed with new guitar tracks and backing vocals by Richards and/or Ronnie Wood. Jagger overdubbed the harmonica of "Mannish Boy" as well. Only "Around and Around" is untouched. April Wine opened for the Stones, who appeared on the bill under the name "The Cockroaches," so the majority in attendance thought they were attending an April Wine concert. April Wine also recorded their live album Live at the El Mocambo at these same concerts.

Jagger and Richards sharply disagreed on the selection of tracks to include on the album. In his autobiography Richards recalled: "Collaboration was giving way to struggle and disagreement. It's a two-disc album, and the result is that one disc is Mick's and the other was mine."
Another factor from the same biography that may have influenced the recording/overdubbing was the passing of Keith's son Tara. As he recalls: "I was in Paris, with Marlon, on tour when I got the news that our little son Tara, aged just over two months, had been found dead in his cot. I got the phone call as I was getting ready to do the show. And it's a "Sorry to tell you... ,” which hits you like a gunshot. And "No doubt you're going to want to cancel the show". And I thought about it for a few seconds and I said, of course we're not cancelling. It would be the worst possible thing because there was nowhere else to go. What am I going to do, drive back to Switzerland and find out what didn't happen? It's happened already. It's done. Or sit there and mope and go bananas and get into, what? Why?"

Re-releases
In 1998, Love You Live was remastered and reissued by Virgin Records, and in 2009, was re-released with an updated remastering by Universal Records. In 2011 it was released on a single SHM-SACD by Universal Music Enterprises Japan.

Track listing
All songs by Mick Jagger and Keith Richards, except where noted.

Side one
"Intro: Excerpt from Fanfare for the Common Man" (Aaron Copland) – 1:24
"Honky Tonk Women" – 3:19 
"If You Can't Rock Me"/"Get Off of My Cloud" – 5:00 
"Happy" – 2:55 
"Hot Stuff" – 4:35 
"Star Star" – 4:10 

Side two
"Tumbling Dice" – 4:00 
"Fingerprint File" – 5:17 
"You Gotta Move" (Fred McDowell/Rev. Gary Davis) – 4:19 
"You Can't Always Get What You Want" – 7:42 

Side three
"Mannish Boy" (Ellas McDaniel/McKinley Morganfield/Mel London) – 6:28 
"Crackin' Up" (Ellas McDaniel) – 5:40 
"Little Red Rooster" (Willie Dixon) – 4:39 
"Around and Around" (Chuck Berry) – 4:09 

Side four
"It's Only Rock 'n' Roll (But I Like It)" – 4:31 
"Brown Sugar" – 3:11 
"Jumpin' Jack Flash" – 4:03 
"Sympathy for the Devil" – 7:51 
 Love You Live was the final album where Keith Richards' name would be spelled as "Keith Richard." He returned to spelling his surname "Richards" beginning with 1978's Some Girls. The artwork for many, but not all, of the CD issues of Love You Live have been altered to show the spelling as "Richards."
 A couple of minor song title differences: "Jumpin' Jack Flash" is spelled with a "g" instead of the usual apostrophe (although it is corrected on the CD reissue), while "It's Only Rock 'n' Roll (But I Like It)" loses its parenthetical (thing).

Personnel
The Rolling Stones
Mick Jagger – lead vocals, guitar, harmonica on "Mannish Boy" and "Little Red Rooster"
Keith Richards – guitars, backing vocals, lead vocal on "Happy"
Ronnie Wood – guitars, backing vocals, bass guitar on "Fingerprint File"
Bill Wyman – bass guitar, synthesizer on "Fingerprint File"
Charlie Watts – drums

Additional personnel
Billy Preston – piano, organ, clavinet, backing vocals
Ollie Brown – percussion, backing vocals
Ian Stewart – piano, organ

Technical
Recording engineers –  Keith Harwood, Ron Nevison, Eddie Kramer
Remix engineers – Dave Jordan, Jimmy Douglass and Eddie Kramer
Assistant engineers – Tom Heid, Randy Mason, Mick McKenna, and Bobby Warner
Artwork – Andy Warhol

Charts

Weekly charts

Year-end charts

Certifications

References

1977 live albums
Albums produced by the Glimmer Twins
The Rolling Stones live albums
Atlantic Records live albums
Rolling Stones Records live albums
Virgin Records live albums
Albums with cover art by Andy Warhol
Music of Toronto